Abhijan is a 1962 Indian Bengali-language film directed by Satyajit Ray.

Introduction 
The film gives the famous Ray flavour in its composition, flow and dialogues, and use of symbols. The protagonist Narasingh (played by Soumitra Chatterjee) was a direct influence for the character of the cynical cab driver Travis Bickle (played by Robert De Niro) in Martin Scorsese's Taxi Driver (1976). Scorsese himself has credited Satyajit Ray as a major influence on his work.

Plot 
Soumitra Chatterjee plays Narsingh, a taxi driver. Narsingh is a proud and hot-tempered Rajput with a passion for his car, a vintage 1930 Chrysler and his Rajput heritage. Being a descendant of a royal Rajput family, his self-esteem is reflected through his inability to accept insult and defeat, as a result of which he even takes part in a small race with his car. He does not want to be the one who falls behind and develops a strong hatred for women and mankind in general. As a result of reckless driving, while overtaking the car which carried the district inspector, his licence is taken from him. He is utterly destroyed by it, since the cab was his life after his wife had left him for good. Deeply affected by the insult and a feeling of rootlessness, he decides to go back to the land of rajput where his true rajput lineage will be respected.  While on an aimless journey, Narsingh is picked up by Sukharam who is a local Marwari businessman with a record of smuggling and human trafficking.

Sukharam (Charuprakash Ghosh) offers him a handsome fee to transport some goods which actually is opium. The realisation of the immoral trade puts Narsingh in a compromising position, but he decides to join hands with Sukharam anyway. After all no one he saw was truly following the path of law and morality, not even his ideal and beloved Neeli (Ruma Guha Thakurta).

Neeli runs away with the crippled lover of hers and Narsingh's deep distrust of women deepens. As a result, even after knowing that Gulabi is a victim of Sukharams trafficking he forces her to sleep with him without any emotional involvement. At this point he is almost on the verge of becoming the one he used to hate, the lawless ones who also fail to face the world.

Gulabi (Waheeda Rehman), on the other hand is a melancholy, demonstrative and beautiful village widow. Gulabi is instinctively drawn to Narsingh. In spite of losing her dignity, she still looks at the bright side of life and has trust that Narsingh is not immoral. She is attracted to him from the beginning and ready for a physical relationship, though not as a prostitute which Sukharam intended her to be at that time, but as a village girl.

After he decides to join the gang of smugglers consisting of a legal deal and selling his car, he finds that all his friends that had been with him for so long, including Rama, and Neeli's brother, have abandoned him. He gets the money and social status he wanted but reduces himself to Mama Bhagne, a symbol of someone carrying the baggage of his own sin on his head, until he topples and is reduced to mere pebbles with no dignity. He changes, and rescues Gulabi just in time, before she was to be sold to the same lawyer who was a member of the smuggling racket he had thought of joining.

The tension of the good and evil collapses and the old car makes another journey into nothingness but with a halo of light ahead of it, the light of love.

Cast 
 Soumitra Chatterjee as Narsingh
 Waheeda Rehman as Gulabi
 Ruma Guha Thakurta as Neeli
 Rabi Ghosh as Rama
 Gnyanesh Mukherjee as Joseph
 Charuprakash Ghosh as Sukharam
 Arun Roy

Preservation 
The Academy Film Archive preserved Abhijan in 2001.

Awards 
National Film Awards
 1962: All India Certificate of Merit for the Second Best Feature Film

References 

Satyajit Ray, The Inner Eye – W. Andrew Robinson,

External links 
Abhijan at satyajitray.org
 
 

Films directed by Satyajit Ray
Bengali-language Indian films
1962 films
1960s Indian films
Films with screenplays by Satyajit Ray
Second Best Feature Film National Film Award winners
1960s Bengali-language films